Charles Edward Bounton (23 April 1881 – 22 December 1968) was a British sport shooter who competed in the 1924 Summer Olympics. In 1924, he finished in 13th place in the 25 m rapid fire pistol competition.

References

External links
 

1881 births
1968 deaths
British male sport shooters
ISSF pistol shooters
Olympic shooters of Great Britain
Shooters at the 1924 Summer Olympics